Zulqarnain can refer to:

 Zulqarnain (cricketer), a Pakistani cricketer
 Zulkarnain (footballer) (born 1982), Indonesian footballer
 Zulqarnain Haider
 Zulqarnain Sikandar Pakistani fashion model
 a transliteration for Dhul-Qarnayn